Lubriano is a  (municipality) of about 900 inhabitants in the Province of Viterbo in the Italian region of Latium, located about  northwest of Rome and about  north of Viterbo.

Lubriano borders the following municipalities: Bagnoregio, Castiglione in Teverina, Orvieto and Porano.

References

Cities and towns in Lazio